Sefer Baygin (born 6 February 1942) is a Turkish former wrestler who won the 1972 European Wrestling Championships. and competed in the 1972 Summer Olympics.

1969 European Wrestling Championships

1971 Mediterranean Games Champion

References

External links
 

1942 births
Living people
Olympic wrestlers of Turkey
Wrestlers at the 1972 Summer Olympics
Turkish male sport wrestlers
Turkish people of Circassian descent